The WIG30 is a capitalization-weighted stock market index of the thirty largest companies on the Warsaw Stock Exchange. The WIG30 index has been published since September 23, 2013, based on the value of the portfolio of shares of the 30 largest and most liquid companies on the WSE Main Market. The base value of the index was established on December 28, 2012, and amounted to 2,582.98 points. WIG30 is a price-type index, which means that when calculating it, only the prices of transactions concluded in it are taken into account, and no dividend income is included. The WIG30 index may not include more than 7 companies from one exchange sector, and the share of one company is limited to 10% in the index.

Components 
A list of the current WIG30 companies:

References

External links 
 WIG30 on the Warsaw Stock Exchange

European stock market indices
Warsaw Stock Exchange